John Duncan Cowley FLA (1897–1944) was Director of the School of Librarianship of the University of London from 1934 to 1944 and was the Goldsmiths' Librarian in 1944. He joined the RAFVR in 1940 and was a Squadron Leader at the time of his death.

Works
Cowley is the author of A Bibliography of Abridgments, Digests, Dictionaries, and Indexes of English Law to the Year 1800, which was published by the Selden Society in London in 1932. It is "valuable" and "thoroughly commendable". The Use of Reference Material: An Introductory Manual for Librarianship Students and Assistants was published by Grafton in London in 1937, and Training for Librarianship in the United States was published by the University of London in 1938. Bibliographical Description and Cataloguing was published in octavo in 1939 by Grafton in London. It was reprinted in 1970 as number 341 in the Burt Franklin bibliography and reference series. Matter in the book continued to be of interest in 1972, despite its age.

Legacy
Cowley was commemorated by the Cowley Prize awarded by University College London.

References
"Cowley, John Duncan", Who Was Who, A & C Black, an imprint of Bloomsbury Publishing plc, 1920–2015; online edition, Oxford University Press, April 2014.
Hart, E P (ed). "Cowley, John Duncan" in Merchant Taylors' School Register, 1851-1920. Merchant's Taylors' Company. 1923. Page 408. Google Books
The Library World: 47 (535) 49. October 1944. Google Books.
The School Librarian. 5 October 1944. Page 121. Vols 3-4, Google Books.
The Library Association Record. 9 September 1944. Page 172. Google Books:  
"The late Squadron Leader J. D. Cowley". The Librarian and Book World. 1944. Vols 33–34. Page 145. Google Books:  
The Library World. 1966. Vols 67–68. Page 134. Google Books.
The Year's Work in Librarianship. Volume 12. Library Association. 1949. Page 203. Google Books.
Thomas Kelly. A History of Public Libraries in Great Britain 1845–1965. Library Association. 1973. Page 332. Google Books.
Milne, A T. Librarianship and Literature: Essays in Honour of Jack Pafford. A & C Black. p 4.
MacDonald and Broughton (eds). Annual Bibliography of English Language & Literature. Cambridge University Press. 1952. Volume 22 (1941). Page 3. Serjeantson and Broughton (eds). Volume 18 (1937). Published 1939. Page 10.
Marke J J. A Catalogue of the Law Collection at New York University. New York University Law Library. 1953. p 1193.

1897 births
1944 deaths
British librarians
Royal Air Force Volunteer Reserve personnel of World War II
Royal Air Force squadron leaders
Royal Air Force personnel killed in World War II